Gone is the debut studio album by American band Vacationer. It was released in 2012 under Downtown Records.

Critical reception
The Line of Best Fit wrote that "warm harmonies and click-clack percussion pervades everything and suffocates anything that might have been an interesting execution ... you can have any style of music you like as long as you want a profoundly beige, gloopy style of music." Alternative Press called the album "textured indie pop buoyed by tropical percussion, soulful crooning, quirky samples and atmospheric keyboards."

Track list

References

2012 albums
Downtown Records albums